Centane, alternatively rendered Kentane or Kentani is a settlement in Amathole District Municipality in the Eastern Cape province of South Africa.

History 
Centane was the site of the battle of Centane on 7 February 1878 during the ninth Frontier War, where in more than 300 Xhosa were killed for the loss of only two British soldiers.

The grave of the Xhosa king, Khawuta kaGcaleka (the father of Bhurhu kaKhawuta and Hintsa kaKhawuta) is in this town in the village of Njingini.

Nongqawuse was born in Centane in a village called Gxarra

Tourism
There are a number of beaches in Centane, including Qolorha By Sea, Mazzepa Bay and Wavecrest.

See also 
 2020 Centane bus crash

References

Populated places in the Mnquma Local Municipality